Wall of Chefs is a Canadian reality television series, which premiered February 3, 2020 on Food Network. Hosted by Noah Cappe, the series features four amateur home chefs per episode competing in culinary challenges, judged by a rotating panel featuring some of Canada's most prominent chefs and restaurateurs. After each round, one of the competitors is eliminated, and the winner of the episode is awarded $10,000.

The series features three rounds of challenges: "Crowd-Pleaser", where all four competitors are asked to prepare their own most popular dish; "Chef's Fridge", in which the three remaining competitors are challenged to create a dish using three ingredients revealed by one of the professional chefs as staple ingredients in their own fridges; and "Restaurant-Worthy", in which the two finalists are challenged to create a restaurant-calibre dish inspired by one of the judges' own signature dishes.

Twelve chefs appear as the "Wall of Chefs" on each episode, with four of them judging each round before all of the chefs vote on the final winner of the episode. A total of 33 chefs appeared overall throughout the first season of the series, including Hugh Acheson, Suzanne Barr, Massimo Capra, Alex Chen, Lynn Crawford, Christine Cushing, Rob Feenie, Rob Gentile, Susur Lee, Nick Liu, Dale MacKay, Mark McEwan and Todd Perrin.

The series is produced by Insight Productions. It received a Canadian Screen Award nomination for Best Reality/Competition Series at the 9th Canadian Screen Awards in 2021.

Episodes

References

2020 Canadian television series debuts
2020s Canadian cooking television series
2020s Canadian reality television series
Food Network (Canadian TV channel) original programming
Cooking competitions in Canada
Television series by Insight Productions